Surgutsky District  is an administrative and municipal district (raion), one of the nine in Khanty-Mansi Autonomous Okrug, Russia. It is located in the center of the autonomous okrug. Its administrative center is the city of Surgut (which is not administratively a part of the district). Population: 113,515 (2010 Census);

Administrative and municipal status
Within the framework of administrative divisions, Surgutsky District is one of the nine in the autonomous okrug. The city of Surgut serves as its administrative center, despite being incorporated separately as a city of okrug significance—an administrative unit with the status equal to that of the districts.

As a municipal division, the district is incorporated as Surgutsky Municipal District. The city of okrug significance of Surgut is incorporated separately from the district as Surgut Urban Okrug.

References

Notes

Sources

Districts of Khanty-Mansi Autonomous Okrug
